Kelvin Grove is a suburb of Palmerston North on New Zealand's North Island. It is bounded on the north by the North Island Main Trunk railway, Manawatu District and Milson, on the west by Palmerston North–Gisborne Line and Roslyn, the south by the Manawatu River, and the east by James Line and Whakarongo.

It was identified as one of New Zealand's fastest growth suburbs in November 2016.

The lower North Island distribution centres of Foodstuffs, Coca-Cola Amatil and Woolworths New Zealand are located in Kelvin Grove. The national customer centre of Toyota New Zealand and the Radius Peppertree rest home and hospital is also located on Roberts Line.

Many Kelvin Grove street name are named after New Zealand places, such as Kaimanawa, Anakiwa, Karamea, Mahia and Wairau. Local parks include Kaimanawa Park, Celaeno Park, Kelvin Grove Park, Linklater Block, Schnell Reserve, Schnell Esplanade Reserve, Robêrt Reserve, Frederick Krull Reserve, Dahlstrom Reserve, James Line Reserve and Parnell Reserve.

History

Pre-European history

The original inhabitants of the area were the local Rangitāne iwi, and was part of the Te-Ahu-a-Turanga block that was sold by Rangitāne in 1865.

European settlement

The first Europeans arrived in Kelvin Grove in 1871 when Scandinavian immigrants settled in the area around present day Roberts Line-James Line and Napier Road block. This area and also that of Whakarongo, became known as the Stoney Creek Scandinavian Block. At this time the area was mainly thick forest, which had to be felled in order for settlement. This was achieved by the mid-1870s.

In 1893, Kelvin Grove School was established and Kelvin Grove as an entity of its own was established. Kelvin Grove was the name of the local sawmill (which had opened in 1879). In 1901, Kelvin Grove Hall was built. In 1921, however, the hall burnt down and was not replaced until 1935.

In 1939, Kelvin Grove School closed down, due to parents choosing other schools such as Milson or Terrace End.

Urban development

In 1950, part of Kelvin Grove was brought under the jurisdiction of Palmerston North City, but it was not until 1966 when houses began to appear especially in the Karamea Crescent and Mahia Place area. The mostly rural suburb has gradually expanded since then.

Prior to 1996, Kelvin Grove was part of the Manawatu electorate. This electorate included parts of Palmerston North, east of Ruahine Street as well as Linton Camp, Turitea, Aokautere and Roslyn. However, due to the reformation of the electoral system from FPP to MMP, the electorate of Rangitikei's boundaries were redrawn to include Kelvin Grove. A 2007 boundary redistribution includes Kelvin Grove in the Palmerston North electorate.

Several new homes were built in Kelvin Grove during the 2010s. A housing development in Kelvin Grove was one of the first to restart, following the coronavirus lockdown in 2020.

Demographics

It had a population of 7,203 at the 2018 New Zealand census, an increase of 435 people (6.4%) since the 2013 census, and an increase of 2,403 people (50.1%) since the 2006 census. There were 2,424 households. There were 3,528 males and 3,678 females, giving a sex ratio of 0.96 males per female, with 1,704 people (23.7%) aged under 15 years, 1,362 (18.9%) aged 15 to 29, 3,246 (45.1%) aged 30 to 64, and 897 (12.5%) aged 65 or older.

Ethnicities were 76.9% European/Pākehā, 15.6% Māori, 4.1% Pacific peoples, 13.9% Asian, and 3.4% other ethnicities (totals add to more than 100% since people could identify with multiple ethnicities).

The proportion of people born overseas was 19.8%, compared with 27.1% nationally.

Although some people objected to giving their religion, 46.4% had no religion, 39.4% were Christian, 2.0% were Hindu, 1.0% were Muslim, 1.9% were Buddhist and 3.3% had other religions.

Of those at least 15 years old, 1,221 (22.2%) people had a bachelor or higher degree, and 978 (17.8%) people had no formal qualifications. The employment status of those at least 15 was that 3,051 (55.5%) people were employed full-time, 792 (14.4%) were part-time, and 204 (3.7%) were unemployed.

Cemetery

Kelvin Grove Cemetery is Palmerston North's main cemetery, performing about 180 burials and 400 cremations each year. It was opened in 1927 to replace the old Terrace End Cemetery on Napier Road, the crematorium and chapel were added in 1954, and a modern gas-fired cremator was installed in 2003.

The cemetery allows flower garden tributes, unlike other cemeteries in the region.

In 2018, a group of four roosters and three chickens were trapped at the cemetery and sent to slaughter, several years after they had been dumped there.

he Palmerston North branch of the Returned Services' Association and soldiers from the Linton Military Camp reached an agreement with Palmerston North City Council in 2019 to clean the headstones of 1000 veterans buried at the cemetery. The association had to also seek permission from the veterans' families.

Bronze plaques, bronze flower holders and a sundial were stolen from the cemetery in February 2020.

Education

There is also a kindergarten in the suburb.

References

Suburbs of Palmerston North
Populated places in Manawatū-Whanganui